

Events

Pre-1600
2457 BC – Gaecheonjeol, Hwanung (환웅) purportedly descended from heaven. South Korea's National Foundation Day.
52 BC – Gallic Wars: Vercingetorix, leader of the Gauls, surrenders to the Romans under Julius Caesar, ending the siege and battle of Alesia.
42 BC – Liberators' civil war: Triumvirs Mark Antony and Octavian fight to a draw Caesar's assassins Brutus and Cassius in the first part of the Battle of Philippi, where Cassius commits suicide believing the battle is lost.
 382 – Roman Emperor Theodosius I concludes a peace treaty with the Goths and settles them in the Balkans.
1392 – Muhammed VII becomes the twelfth sultan of the Emirate of Granada. 
1574 – The Siege of Leiden is lifted by the Watergeuzen.

1601–1900
1683 – Qing dynasty naval commander Shi Lang receives the surrender of the Tungning kingdom on Taiwan after the Battle of Penghu.
1712 – The Duke of Montrose issues a warrant for the arrest of Rob Roy MacGregor.
1739 – The Treaty of Niš is signed by the Ottoman Empire and Russia ending the Russian–Turkish War.
1789 – George Washington proclaims Thursday November 26, 1789 a Thanksgiving Day.
1792 – A militia departs from the Spanish stronghold of Valdivia to quell a Huilliche uprising in southern Chile.
1863 – The last Thursday in November is declared as Thanksgiving Day by U.S. President Abraham Lincoln.
1873 – Chief Kintpuash and companions are hanged for their part in the Modoc War of northern California.

1901–present
1912 – U.S. forces defeat Nicaraguan rebels at the Battle of Coyotepe Hill.
1918 – Tsar Boris III of Bulgaria accedes to the throne.
1919 – Cincinnati Reds pitcher Adolfo Luque becomes the first Latin American player to appear in a World Series.
1929 – The Kingdom of Serbs, Croats and Slovenes is renamed to Yugoslavia by King Alexander I.
1932 – The Kingdom of Iraq gains independence from the United Kingdom.
1935 – Second Italo-Abyssinian War: Italy invades Ethiopia.
1942 – A German V-2 rocket reaches a record 85 km (46 nm) in altitude.
1943 – World War II: German forces murder 92 civilians in Lingiades, Greece.
1946 – An American Overseas Airlines Douglas DC-4 crashes near Ernest Harmon Air Force Base in Stephenville, Newfoundland and Labrador, Canada, killing 39.
1949 – WERD, the first black-owned radio station in the United States, opens in Atlanta.
1951 – Korean War: The First Battle of Maryang San pits Commonwealth troops against communist Chinese troops.
1952 – The United Kingdom successfully tests a nuclear weapon in the Montebello Islands, Western Australia, to become the world's third nuclear power.
1957 – The California State Superior Court rules that the book Howl and Other Poems is not obscene.
1962 – Project Mercury: US astronaut Wally Schirra, in Sigma 7, is launched from Cape Canaveral for a six-orbit flight.
1963 – A violent coup in Honduras begins two decades of military rule.
1981 – The hunger strike at the Maze Prison in Northern Ireland ends after seven months and ten deaths.
1985 – The Space Shuttle Atlantis makes its maiden flight, carrying two DSCS-III Satellites on STS-51-J.
1986 – TASCC, a superconducting cyclotron at the Chalk River Laboratories in Canada, is officially opened.
1989 – A coup in Panama City is suppressed and 11 participants are executed.
1990 – The German Democratic Republic is abolished and becomes part of the Federal Republic of Germany; the event is afterwards celebrated as German Unity Day.
1991 – Nadine Gordimer is announced as the winner of the Nobel Prize in Literature.
1993 – An American attack against a warlord in Mogadishu fails; eighteen US soldiers and over 350 Somalis die.
1995 – O. J. Simpson murder case: O. J. Simpson is acquitted of the murders of Nicole Brown Simpson and Ronald Goldman.
2008 – The Emergency Economic Stabilization Act of 2008 for the U.S. financial system is signed by President George W. Bush.
2009 – Azerbaijan, Kazakhstan, Kyrgyzstan, and Turkey join in the Turkic Council.
2013 – At least 360 migrants are killed when their boat sinks near the Italian island of Lampedusa.
2015 – Forty-two people are killed and 33 go missing in the Kunduz hospital airstrike in Afghanistan.
2021 – Eight people are killed in an airplane crash near Milan, Italy.
2022 – Svante Pääbo is awarded the Nobel Prize in Physiology or Medicine.

Births

Pre-1600
85 BC – Gaius Cassius Longinus, Roman politician (d. 42 BC)
1292 – Eleanor de Clare, English noblewoman (d. 1337)
1390 – Humphrey, Duke of Gloucester (d. 1447)
1458 – Saint Casimir, Prince of Poland and Duke of Lithuania (d. 1484)
1554 – Fulke Greville, 1st Baron Brooke, English poet (d. 1628)

1601–1900
1610 – Gabriel Lalemant, French-Canadian missionary and saint (d. 1649)
1631 – Sebastian Anton Scherer, German organist and composer (d. 1712)
1637 – George Gordon, 1st Earl of Aberdeen, Lord Chancellor of Scotland (d. 1720)
1713 – Antoine Dauvergne, French violinist and composer (d. 1797)
1716 – Giovanni Battista Beccaria, Italian physicist and academic (d. 1781)
1720 – Johann Uz, German poet and judge (d. 1796)
1790 – John Ross, American tribal chief (d. 1866)
1797 – Leopold II, Grand Duke of Tuscany (d. 1870)
1800 – George Bancroft, American historian and politician, 17th United States Secretary of the Navy (d. 1891)
1804 – Townsend Harris, American merchant, politician, and diplomat, United States Ambassador to Japan (d. 1878)
  1804   – Allan Kardec, French author, translator, educator and founder of modern Spiritism (d. 1869)
1828 – Woldemar Bargiel, German composer and educator (d. 1897)
1837 – Nicolás Avellaneda, Argentinian journalist and politician, 8th President of Argentina (d. 1885)
1846 – James Jackson Putnam, American neurologist and academic (d. 1918)
1848 – Henry Lerolle, French painter and art collector (d. 1929)
1858 – Eleonora Duse, Italian actress (d. 1924)
1862 – Johnny Briggs, English cricketer and rugby player (d. 1902)
1863 – Pyotr Kozlov, Russian archaeologist and explorer (d. 1935)
1865 – Gustave Loiseau, French painter (d. 1935)
1866 – Josephine Sabel, American singer and comedian (d. 1945)
1867 – Pierre Bonnard, French painter (d. 1947)
1869 – Alfred Flatow, German gymnast (d. 1942)
1875 – Dr. Atl, Mexican painter (d. 1964)
1879 – Warner Oland, Swedish-American actor and singer (d. 1938)
1882 – A. Y. Jackson, Canadian painter and academic (d. 1974)
1885 – Sophie Treadwell, American playwright and journalist (d. 1970)
1886 – Alain-Fournier, French soldier, author, and critic (d. 1914)
1888 – Wade Boteler, American actor and screenwriter (d. 1943)
1889 – Carl von Ossietzky, German journalist and activist, Nobel Prize laureate (d. 1938)
1890 – Emilio Portes Gil, Mexican politician, President of Mexico (d. 1978)
1894 – Elmer Robinson, American lawyer and politician, 33rd Mayor of San Francisco (d. 1982)
  1894   – Walter Warlimont, German general (d. 1976)
1895 – Giovanni Comisso, Italian author and poet (d. 1969)
  1895   – Sergei Yesenin, Russian poet (d. 1925)
1896 – Auvergne Doherty, Australian businesswoman (d. 1961)
  1896   – Gerardo Diego, Spanish poet and critic (d. 1987)
1897 – Louis Aragon, French author and poet (d. 1982)
1898 – Leo McCarey, American director and screenwriter (d. 1969)
  1898   – Adolf Reichwein, German economist and educator (d. 1944)
1899 – Gertrude Berg, American actress, screenwriter and producer (d. 1966)
1900 – Thomas Wolfe, American novelist (d. 1938)

1901–present
1901 – Jean Grémillon, French director, composer, and screenwriter (d. 1959)
1904 – Ernst-Günther Schenck, German colonel and physician (d. 1998)
1905 – Tekin Arıburun, Turkish soldier and politician, President of Turkey (d. 1993)
1906 – Natalie Savage Carlson, American author (d. 1997)
1908 – Johnny Burke, American songwriter (d. 1964)
1911 – Michael Hordern, English actor (d. 1995)
1912 – Charles Wood, 2nd Earl of Halifax, British peer, Conservative politician (d. 1980)
1915 – Ray Stark, American film producer (d. 2004)
1916 – James Herriot, English veterinarian and author (d. 1995)
1919 – James M. Buchanan, American economist and academic, Nobel Prize laureate (d. 2013)
1921 – Ray Lindwall, Australian cricketer and soldier (d. 1996)
1923 – Edward Oliver LeBlanc, Dominican lawyer and politician, 1st Premier of Dominica (d. 2004)
1924 – Harvey Kurtzman, American cartoonist (d. 1993)
  1924   – Arkady Vorobyov, Russian weightlifter and coach (d. 2012)
1925 – Simone Segouin (also known as Nicole Minet), French Resistance fighter and partisan (d. 2023)
  1925   – Gore Vidal, American novelist, screenwriter, and critic (d. 2012)
  1925   – George Wein, American pianist and producer, co-founded the Newport Folk Festival (d. 2021)
1926 – Gerardo P. Cabochan, Filipino politician (d. 2014)
1928 – Erik Bruhn, Danish dancer and choreographer (d. 1986)
  1928   – Edward L. Moyers, American businessman (d. 2006)
  1928   – Shridath Ramphal, Guyanese academic and politician, 2nd Commonwealth Secretary-General
1931 – Glenn Hall, Canadian ice hockey player and coach
1932 – Terence English, South African-English surgeon and academic
1933 – Neale Fraser, Australian tennis player
1934 – Benjamin Boretz, American composer and theorist
  1934   – Miguel-Ángel Cárdenas, Colombian-Dutch painter and illustrator (d. 2015)
  1934   – Harold Henning, South African golfer (d. 2004)
  1934   – Simon Nicholson, English sculptor and painter (d. 1990)
1935 – Charles Duke, American general, pilot, and astronaut
  1935   – Armen Dzhigarkhanyan, Soviet Russian-Armenian actor (d. 2020)
1936 – Steve Reich, American composer
1938 – Eddie Cochran, American singer-songwriter, guitarist, and actor (d. 1960)
  1938   – David Hart Dyke, English captain
  1938   – Jack Hodgins, Canadian author and academic
  1938   – Dave Obey, American lawyer and politician
1939 – Bob Armstrong, American wrestler and trainer (d. 2020)
1940 – Alan O'Day, American singer-songwriter (d. 2013)
  1940   – Jean Ratelle, Canadian ice hockey player and coach
  1940   – Mike Troy, American swimmer (d. 2019)
1941 – Chubby Checker, American singer-songwriter
  1941   – Andrea de Adamich, Italian race car driver and sportscaster
  1941   – John Elliott, Australian businessman (d. 2021)
1943 – Jeff Bingaman, American soldier and politician, 25th Attorney General of New Mexico
  1943   – Baki İlkin, Turkish civil servant and diplomat
1944 – Pierre Deligne, Belgian mathematician and academic
1945 – Tony Brown, English footballer and sportscaster
  1945   – Christopher Bruce, English dancer and choreographer
  1945   – Jo Ritzen, Dutch economist and politician, Dutch Minister of Education
1946 – P. P. Arnold, American soul singer
1947 – John Perry Barlow, American poet, songwriter, blogger, and activist (d. 2018)
  1947   – Ben Cauley, American trumpet player and songwriter  (d. 2015)
  1947   – Fred DeLuca, American businessman (d. 2015)
  1947   – Anne Dorte of Rosenborg (d. 2014)
  1947   – Takis Michalos, Greek water polo player and coach (d. 2010)
1949 – Lindsey Buckingham, American singer-songwriter, guitarist, and producer 
  1949   – J. P. Dutta, Indian director, producer, and screenwriter
  1949   – Aleksandr Rogozhkin, Russian director and screenwriter
  1949   – Laurie Simmons, American photographer and director
1950 – Ronnie Laws, American jazz, R&B, and funk saxophone player 
1951 – Keb' Mo', American blues musician and songwriter
  1951   – Kathryn D. Sullivan, American geologist and astronaut 
  1951   – Dave Winfield, American baseball player and sportscaster
1952 – Bruce Arians, American football coach
  1952   – Gary Troup, New Zealand cricketer
1954 – Eddie DeGarmo, American singer-songwriter, keyboard player, and producer 
  1954   – Dennis Eckersley, American baseball player and sportscaster
  1954   – Al Sharpton, American minister, talk show host, and political activist
  1954   – Stevie Ray Vaughan, American singer-songwriter, guitarist, and producer (d. 1990)
1955 – Moshe Kam, American engineering educator 
  1955   – John S. Lesmeister, American educator and politician, 30th North Dakota State Treasurer (d. 2006)
  1955   – Allen Woody, American bass player and songwriter  (d. 2000)
  1955   – Buket Uzuner, Turkish author
1956 – Hart Bochner, Canadian actor, director, producer, and screenwriter
1957 – Roberto Azevêdo, Brazilian engineer and diplomat, 6th Director-General of the World Trade Organization
  1957   – Tim Westwood, English radio and television host
1958 – Chen Yanyin, Chinese sculptor
  1958   – Louise Lecavalier, Canadian dancer and choreographer
1959 – Craig Bellamy, Australian rugby league player and coach
  1959   – Fred Couples, American golfer
  1959   – Greg Proops, American comedian, actor, and screenwriter
  1959   – Jack Wagner, American actor and singer
1961 – Rebecca Stephens, English journalist and mountaineer
  1961   – Ludger Stühlmeyer, German cantor, composer, and musicologist
1962 – Tommy Lee, Greek-American singer-songwriter, drummer, and producer 
  1962   – Simon Scarrow, Nigerian-English novelist
1963 – Benny Anders, American basketball player
  1963   – Dan Goldie, American tennis player
1964 – Clive Owen, English actor 
1965 – Annemarie Verstappen, Dutch swimmer
  1965   – Jan-Ove Waldner, Swedish table tennis player
1966 – Darrin Fletcher, American baseball player and sportscaster
1967 – Rob Liefeld, American author and illustrator
  1967   – Chris Collingwood, English-American singer-songwriter, guitarist, and producer 
1968 – Paul Crichton, English footballer and manager
  1968   – Greg Foster, American basketball player and coach
  1968   – Marko Rajamäki, Finnish footballer and manager
  1968   – Donald Sild, Estonian javelin thrower
1969 – Garry Herbert, English rower and sportscaster
  1969   – Gwen Stefani, American singer-songwriter, actress, and fashion designer 
  1969   – Tetsuya, Japanese singer-songwriter, bass player, and producer 
1970 – Elmar Liitmaa, Estonian guitarist and songwriter 
  1970   – Jimmy Ray, English singer-songwriter and guitarist
1971 – Wil Cordero, Puerto Rican-American baseball player and coach
  1971   – Kevin Richardson, American singer-songwriter and actor 
1972 – Komla Dumor, Ghanaian-English journalist (d. 2014)
  1972   – G. Love, American singer-songwriter, guitarist, and harmonica player 
  1972   – Guy Oseary, Israeli-American talent manager and businessman
1973 – Neve Campbell, Canadian actress
1973 – Angélica Gavaldón, American-Mexican tennis player and coach
  1973   – Lena Headey, British actress
  1973   – Eirik Hegdal, Norwegian saxophonist and composer
1974 – Mike Johnson, Canadian ice hockey player and sportscaster
  1974   – Marianne Timmer, Dutch speed skater
1975 – India Arie, American singer-songwriter, producer, and actress
  1975   – Phil Greening, English rugby player and coach
  1975   – Satoko Ishimine, Japanese singer-songwriter, guitarist, and producer
1976 – Herman Li, Hong Kong-English guitarist and producer 
  1976   – Seann William Scott, American actor and producer
1977 – Daniel Hollie, American wrestler
  1977   – Eric Munson, American baseball player and coach
  1977   – Luca Tognozzi, Italian footballer
1978 – Gerald Asamoah, Ghanaian-German footballer
  1978   – Neil Clement, English footballer
  1978   – Claudio Pizarro, Peruvian footballer
  1978   – Jake Shears, American singer-songwriter 
1979 – Josh Klinghoffer, American guitarist, songwriter, and producer 
  1979   – John Morrison, American wrestler and actor
1980 – Anquan Boldin, American football player
  1980   – Sheldon Brookbank, Canadian ice hockey player
  1980   – Lindsey Kelk, English journalist and author
  1980   – Danny O'Donoghue, Irish singer-songwriter and producer
  1980   – Héctor Reynoso, Mexican footballer
  1980   – Ivan Turina, Croatian footballer (d. 2013)
1981 – Danny Coid, English footballer
  1981   – Zlatan Ibrahimović, Swedish footballer
  1981   – Andreas Isaksson, Swedish footballer
  1981   – Jonna Lee, Swedish singer and musician
  1981   – Ronald Rauhe, German kayaker
  1981   – Matt Sparrow, English footballer
1983 – Fred, Brazilian footballer
  1983   – Thiago Alves, Brazilian mixed martial artist
  1983   – Andreas Papathanasiou, Cypriot footballer
  1983   – Tessa Thompson, American actress
1984 – Yoon Eun-hye, South Korean singer and actress 
  1984   – Bruno Gervais, Canadian ice hockey player
  1984   – Jessica Parker Kennedy, Canadian actress
  1984   – Anthony Le Tallec, French footballer
  1984   – Ashlee Simpson, American singer-songwriter and actress
1985 – Courtney Lee, American basketball player
1986 – Lewis Brown, New Zealand rugby league player
  1986   – Jackson Martínez, Colombian footballer
1987 – Robert Grabarz, English high jumper
  1987   – Martin Plowman, English race car driver
  1987   – Starley, Australian pop singer
1988 – Alicia Vikander, Swedish actress
  1988   – Dustin Gazley, American ice hockey player
  1988   – ASAP Rocky, American rapper and songwriter
1989 – Nate Montana, American football player
  1989   – Alex Trimble, Irish singer
1990 – Johan Le Bon, French cyclist
1991 – Jenny McLoughlin, English sprinter
  1991   – Aki Takajo, Japanese singer 
1993 – Raffaele Di Gennaro, Italian footballer
1994 – Victoria Bosio, Argentinian tennis player
1995 – Lil Tracy, American rapper
1997 – Jin Boyang, Chinese figure skater
2004 – Noah Schnapp, American actor

Deaths

Pre-1600
42 BC – Gaius Cassius Longinus, Roman politician (b. 85 BC)
 723 – Elias I of Antioch, Syriac Orthodox Patriarch of Antioch.
 818 – Ermengarde, queen of the Franks
 900 – Muhammad ibn Zayd, Tabaristan emir 
 959 – Gérard of Brogne, Frankish abbot
1078 – Iziaslav I of Kiev (b. 1024)
1226 – Francis of Assisi, Italian friar and saint (b. 1181 or 1182)
1283 – Dafydd ap Gruffydd, Welsh prince (b. 1238)
1369 – Margaret, Countess of Tyrol (b. 1318)
1399 – Eleanor de Bohun, English noble (b. 1360)
1568 – Elisabeth of Valois (b. 1545)
1596 – Florent Chrestien, French poet (b. 1541)

1601–1900
1611 – Charles, Duke of Mayenne (b. 1554)
1629 – Giorgi Saakadze, Georgian commander and politician (b. 1570)
1649 – Giovanni Diodati, Swiss-Italian clergyman and theologian (b. 1576)
1653 – Marcus Zuerius van Boxhorn, Dutch linguist and academic (b. 1612)
1656 – Myles Standish, English captain (b. 1584)
1690 – Robert Barclay, Scottish theologian and politician, 2nd Governor of East Jersey (b. 1648)
1701 – Joseph Williamson, English politician, Secretary of State for the Northern Department (b. 1633)
1795 – Tula, Curaçao slave leader (date of birth unknown; executed)
1801 – Philippe Henri, marquis de Ségur, French general and politician, French Minister of Defence (b. 1724)
1833 – François, marquis de Chasseloup-Laubat, French general and engineer (b. 1754)
1838 – Black Hawk, American tribal leader (b. 1767)
1860 – Rembrandt Peale, American painter and curator (b. 1778)
1867 – Elias Howe, American engineer, invented the sewing machine (b. 1819)
1873 – Kintpuash, American tribal leader (b. 1837)
1877 – James Roosevelt Bayley, American archbishop (b. 1814)
  1877   – Rómulo Díaz de la Vega, Mexican general and president (1855) (b. 1800)
1881 – Orson Pratt, American mathematician and religious leader (b. 1811)
1890 – Joseph Hergenröther, German historian and cardinal (b. 1824)
1891 – Édouard Lucas, French mathematician and theorist (b. 1842)
1896 – William Morris, English author and poet (b. 1834)

1901–present
1907 – Jacob Nash Victor, American engineer (b. 1835)
1910 – Lucy Hobbs Taylor, American dentist (b. 1833)
1911 – Rosetta Jane Birks, Australian suffragist (b. 1856)
1917 – Eduardo Di Capua, Neapolitan composer, singer and songwriter (b. 1865)
1929 – Jeanne Eagels, American actress (b. 1894)
  1929   – Gustav Stresemann, German politician, Chancellor of Germany, Nobel Prize laureate (b. 1878)
1931 – Carl Nielsen, Danish violinist, composer, and conductor (b. 1865)
1936 – John Heisman, American football player and coach (b. 1869)
1953 – Arnold Bax, English composer and poet (b. 1883)
1959 – Tochigiyama Moriya, Japanese sumo wrestler, the 27th Yokozuna (b. 1892)
1963 – Refet Bele, Turkish general (b. 1877)
1965 – Zachary Scott, American actor (b. 1914)
1966 – Rolf Maximilian Sievert, Swedish physicist and academic (b. 1896)
1967 – Woody Guthrie, American singer-songwriter and guitarist (b. 1912)
  1967   – Malcolm Sargent, English organist, composer, and conductor (b. 1895)
1969 – Skip James, American singer-songwriter and guitarist (b. 1902)
1979 – Nicos Poulantzas, Greek-French sociologist and philosopher (b. 1936)
1980 – Friedrich Karm, Estonian footballer (b. 1907)
1981 – Anna Hedvig Büll, Estonian-German missionary (b. 1887)
1986 – Vince DiMaggio, American baseball player and manager (b. 1912)
1987 – Jean Anouilh, French playwright and screenwriter (b. 1910)
  1987   – Kalervo Palsa, Finnish painter (b. 1947)
1988 – Franz Josef Strauss, Bavarian lieutenant and politician, Minister President of Bavaria (b. 1915)
1990 – Stefano Casiraghi, Italian-Monegasque businessman (b. 1960)
  1990   – Eleanor Steber, American soprano and educator (b. 1914)
1993 – Katerina Gogou, Greek actress, poet, and author (b. 1940)
  1993   – Gary Gordon, American sergeant, Medal of Honor recipient (b. 1960)
  1993   – Randy Shughart, American sergeant, Medal of Honor recipient (b. 1958)
1994 – John C. Champion, American producer and screenwriter (b. 1923)
  1994   – Dub Taylor, American actor (b. 1907)
1995 – Ma. Po. Si.,  Indian author and politician (b. 1906)
1997 – Michael Adekunle Ajasin, Nigerian politician, 3rd Governor of Ondo State (b. 1908)
1998 – Roddy McDowall, English-American actor (b. 1928)
1999 – Akio Morita, Japanese businessman, co-founded Sony (b. 1921)
2000 – Benjamin Orr, American singer-songwriter and bass player (b. 1947)
2001 – Costas Hajihristos, Greek actor, director, producer, and screenwriter (b. 1921)
2002 – Bruce Paltrow, American director, producer, and screenwriter (b. 1943)
2003 – Florence Stanley, American actress (b. 1924)
  2003   – William Steig, American sculptor, author, and illustrator (b. 1907)
2004 – John Cerutti, American baseball player and sportscaster (b. 1960)
  2004   – Janet Leigh, American actress (b. 1927)
2005 – Ronnie Barker, English actor and screenwriter (b. 1929)
  2005   – Nurettin Ersin, Turkish general (b. 1918)
2006 – Lucilla Andrews, Egyptian-Scottish nurse and author (b. 1919)
  2006   – John Crank, English mathematician and physicist (b. 1916)
  2006   – Peter Norman, Australian runner (b. 1942)
  2006   – Alberto Ramento, Filipino bishop (b. 1937)
2007 – M. N. Vijayan, Indian journalist, author, and academic (b. 1930)
2009 – Vladimir Beekman, Estonian poet and translator (b. 1929)
2010 – Ben Mondor, Canadian-American businessman (b. 1925)
  2010   – Abraham Sarmiento, Filipino lawyer and jurist (b. 1921)
2012 – Abdul Haq Ansari, Indian theologian and scholar (b. 1931)
  2012   – Robert F. Christy, American physicist and astrophysicist (b. 1916)
  2012   – Albie Roles, English footballer (b. 1921)
2013 – Sari Abacha, Nigerian footballer (b. 1978)
  2013   – Sergei Belov, Russian basketball player and coach (b. 1944)
  2013   – Joan Thirsk, English cryptologist, historian, and academic (b. 1922)
2014 – Ewen Gilmour, New Zealand comedian and television host (b. 1963)
  2014   – Benedict Groeschel, American priest, psychologist, and talk show host (b. 1933)
  2014   – Jean-Jacques Marcel, French footballer (b. 1931)
  2014   – Kevin Metheny, American businessman (b. 1954)
  2014   – Ward Ruyslinck, Belgian author (b. 1929)
2015 – Denis Healey, English soldier and politician, Shadow Chancellor of the Exchequer (b. 1917)
  2015   – Muhammad Nawaz Khan, Pakistani historian and author (b. 1943)
  2015   – Javed Iqbal, Pakistani philosopher and judge (b. 1925)
2021 – Todd Akin, American politician (b. 1947)
  2021   – Dan Petrescu, Romanian businessman and billionaire (b. 1953)

Holidays and observances
 Christian feast day:
 Abd-al-Masih
 Adalgott
 Blessed Szilárd Bogdánffy
 Dionysius the Areopagite
 Ewald the Black and Ewald the Fair
 Francis Borgia 
 John Raleigh Mott (Episcopal Church)
 Gerard of Brogne
 Hesychius of Sinai
 Théodore Guérin
 Maximian of Bagai
 October 3 (Eastern Orthodox liturgics)
 3 October Festival (Leiden, Netherlands)
 German Unity Day (Germany)
 Mean Girls Day
 Morazán Day (Honduras)
 National Day, celebrates the independence of Iraq from the United Kingdom in 1932.
 National Foundation Day or Gaecheonjeol (South Korea)

References

External links

 
 
 

Days of the year
October